Pink (stylized in all caps) is the debut studio album by Japanese band Chai. The album was released on October 25, 2017 by Otemoyan Records. It was released on September 8, 2018 in North America by Burger Records.

Track listing

Personnel
Chai
 Kana - vocals, guitar
 Mana - vocals, keyboards
 Yuuki - bass guitar, chorus
 Yuna - drums, chorus

Charts

References

2017 albums
Chai (band) albums
Heavenly Recordings albums